Haris Fazlagić (born April 5, 1987) is a former Bosnian-Herzegovinian footballer who played as a midfielder.

Club career

Early career 
Fazlagić played at the youth level with Zeljeznicar. 

In late 2010, he played abroad in the Canadian Soccer League with the expansion franchise Brantford Galaxy. In his debut season with Brantford, he assisted the club in securing a playoff berth by finishing seventh in the First Division. He participated in the CSL Championship final against Hamilton Croatia where he contributed two goals to secure the title for Brantford.

Bosnia 
In 2011, he returned to Serbia to play in the Serbian First League with FK Banat Zrenjanin. He made his debut for Banat on March 12, 2011, against Mladost Lucani. In total, he would play in two matches in the Serbian second tier. Following his short stint in Serbia, he played with FK Famos Hrasnica in the First League of the Federation of Bosnia and Herzegovina.

Canada 
After two years in Europe, he returned to the CSL to sign with another expansion franchise SC Waterloo Region. In the winter of 2012, he returned to Bosnia to play in the country's top league the Premier League of Bosnia and Herzegovina with FK Slavija Sarajevo. He would appear in 14 matches with Sarajevo. After the conclusion of the season, he departed from Sarajevo with the original intention to sign with London City. 

Instead, he would sign with former club Waterloo for the remainder of the 2013 season. He played in the opening round of the 2013 playoffs where he recorded a goal against Brampton City United which advanced the club to the next round. He would make his second championship final appearance where he contributed a goal against Kingston FC to secure the title for Waterloo.

Return to Bosnia 
After the conclusion of the 2013 CSL season, he returned to play in Bosnia's top tier with NK Travnik. Following his short stay in Europe, he returned to Waterloo for the 2014 season. Midway through the 2014 season, he was transferred to league rivals London City before the roster freeze on September 1, 2014. For the 2015 season, he remained in the CSL by returning to play with his former club Brantford Galaxy. In early 2016, he had another stint in the Bosnian second tier with NK Bosna Visoko.

CSL 
For the remainder of the 2016 season, his time was split between Hamilton City and later was traded to Milton SC. In 2017, he signed with Scarborough SC where he recorded the winning goal against FC Vorkuta in the semifinal match in the playoffs. He made his third championship appearance as he recorded a goal against York Region Shooters which sent the match to overtime where Scarborough was defeated in a penalty shootout. In 2019, he played with former club Hamilton City.

References 

1987 births
Living people
Footballers from Sarajevo
Association football midfielders
Bosnia and Herzegovina footballers
FK Banat Zrenjanin players 
Brantford Galaxy players 
FK Famos Hrasnica players
SC Waterloo Region players
FK Slavija Sarajevo players
NK Travnik players
London City players
NK Bosna Visoko players
Hamilton City SC players
Milton SC players 
Scarborough SC players
Serbian First League players
Canadian Soccer League (1998–present) players
Premier League of Bosnia and Herzegovina players
First League of the Federation of Bosnia and Herzegovina players
Bosnia and Herzegovina expatriate footballers
Expatriate footballers in Serbia
Bosnia and Herzegovina expatriate sportspeople in Serbia
Expatriate soccer players in Canada
Bosnia and Herzegovina expatriate sportspeople in Canada